Carlos Alberto Guzmán Fonseca (born 19 May 1994) is a Mexican professional footballer who plays as a right-back for Liga MX club Querétaro.

Club career
Guzmán began his career with Monarcas Morelia in their youth system.  On November 4, 2011, Guzmán made his professional debut for the club in a 1–0 victory over Chiapas.

He was loaned out to Toros Neza for six months where he made six appearances in the Apertura 2012 Copa MX for the club, but did not make any league appearances during his loan stint. He was later sent out on loan to Atlético San Luis where he had more playing time and earned the trust of first division club Puebla who signed him for the 2014 tournament. In the 2014 Torneo Apertura, Carlos would become a regular for the club. He has currently played in every game scoring 3 goals against Pumas, Leones Negros and Cruz Azul.

International career
Guzmán was part of Mexico's under-17 squad that won the 2011 FIFA U-17 World Cup in home soil. Carlos Guzman was also part of the U-21 Mexican team participating in the 2014 Toulon Tournament

Honours
Morelia
Supercopa MX: 2014

Mexico Youth
FIFA U-17 World Cup: 2011
Central American and Caribbean Games: 2014
Pan American Silver Medal: 2015

References

External links
 
 
 
 

1994 births
Living people
Mexico youth international footballers
Atlético Morelia players
Sportspeople from Morelia
Footballers from Michoacán
Mexican footballers
Association football defenders
Liga MX players
Toros Neza footballers
Club Puebla players
Club Tijuana footballers
Club León footballers
Footballers at the 2015 Pan American Games
Pan American Games medalists in football
Pan American Games silver medalists for Mexico
Central American and Caribbean Games medalists in football
Central American and Caribbean Games gold medalists for Mexico
Competitors at the 2014 Central American and Caribbean Games
Medalists at the 2015 Pan American Games
21st-century Mexican people